was a Japanese pianist, active in jazz and video game soundtracks.

Sayama began playing piano as a child and became interested in jazz after seeing the film The Glenn Miller Story. He studied music at Kunitachi College of Music and began playing jazz professionally in the early 1970s, working with Toshiyuki Honda, Shigeharu Mukai, and Kazunori Takeda. He was a member of Shuichi Murakami's trio Ponta Box and also led his own ensembles. In 1991 he began playing with Masahiko Osaka.

Sayama also played for video game soundtracks, including Final Fantasy X-2.

Sayama died on November 14, 2018, at the age of 64.

References

Japanese jazz pianists
1953 births
2018 deaths